The following is a list of state routes in the U.S. state of New Hampshire. All routes in the state are maintained by the New Hampshire Department of Transportation.
New Hampshire route markers feature the profile of the Old Man of the Mountain.



Primary routes

Auxiliary routes

References

External links
 Granite State Roads
 Road Signs of New Hampshire

 
State routes